Below are the 2012 World Series of Poker results.

Key

Results

Event #1: $500 Casino Employees No Limit Hold'em

 2-Day Event: May 27–28
 Number of Entries: 732
 Total Prize Pool: $329,400
 Number of Payouts: 81
 Winning Hand:

Event #2: $1,500 No Limit Hold'em

 3-Day Event: May 28–30
 Number of Entries: 2,101
 Total Prize Pool: $2,836,350
 Number of Payouts: 216
 Winning Hand:

Event #3: $3,000 Heads Up No Limit Hold'em/Pot Limit Omaha

 3-Day Event: May 29–31
 Number of Entries: 317
 Total Prize Pool: $870,870
 Number of Payouts: 64
 Winning Hand:

Event #4: $1,500 Seven Card Stud Hi-Low 8 or Better

 3-Day Event: May 29–31
 Number of Entries: 622
 Total Prize Pool: $839,700
 Number of Payouts: 64
 Winning Hand:

Event #5: $1,500 Pot Limit Hold'em

 3-Day Event: May 30-June 1
 Number of Entries: 639
 Total Prize Pool: $862,650
 Number of Payouts: 72
 Winning Hand:

Event #6: $5,000 No Limit Hold'em Mixed Max

 5-Day Event: May 31-June 4
 Number of Entries: 409
 Total Prize Pool: $1,922,300
 Number of Payouts: 44
 Winning Hand:

Event #7: $1,500 Seven Card Stud

 3-Day Event: May 31-June 2
 Number of Entries: 367
 Total Prize Pool: $495,450
 Number of Payouts: 40
 Winning Hand:

Event #8: $1,500 Omaha Hi-Low Split-8 or Better

 3-Day Event: June 1–3
 Number of Entries: 967
 Total Prize Pool: $1,305,450
 Number of Payouts: 117
 Winning Hand:

Event #9: $1,500 No Limit Hold'em Re-entry

 5-Day Event: June 2–6
 Number of Entries: 3,404
 Total Prize Pool: $4,595,400
 Number of Payouts: 342
 Winning Hand:

Event #10: $5,000 Seven Card Stud

 3-Day Event: June 3–5
 Number of Entries: 145
 Total Prize Pool: $681,500
 Number of Payouts: 16
 Winning Hand:

Event #11: $1,500 Pot Limit Omaha

 3-Day Event: June 4–6
 Number of Entries: 970
 Total Prize Pool: $1,309,500
 Number of Payouts: 117
 Winning Hand:

Event #12: $10,000 Heads Up No Limit Hold'em

 3-Day Event: June 5–7
 Number of Entries: 152
 Total Prize Pool: $1,428,800
 Number of Payouts: 32
 Winning Hand:

Event #13: $1,500 Limit Hold'em

 3-Day Event: June 5–7
 Number of Entries: 730
 Total Prize Pool: $985,500
 Number of Payouts: 81
 Winning Hand:

Event #14: $1,500 No Limit Hold'em Shootout

 3-Day Event: June 6–8
 Number of Entries: 1,138
 Total Prize Pool: $1,536,300
 Number of Payouts: 120
 Winning Hand:

Event #15: $5,000 Seven Card Stud Hi-Low Split-8 or Better

 3-Day Event: June 6–8
 Number of Entries: 212
 Total Prize Pool: $996,400
 Number of Payouts: 24
 Winning Hand:

Event #16: $1,500 No Limit Hold'em Six Handed

 3-Day Event: June 7–9
 Number of Entries: 1,604
 Total Prize Pool: $2,165,400
 Number of Payouts: 162
 Winning Hand:

Event #17: $10,000 Pot Limit Hold'em

 3-Day Event: June 8–10
 Number of Entries: 179
 Total Prize Pool: $1,682,600
 Number of Payouts: 18
 Winning Hand:

Event #18: $2,500 Seven Card Razz

 3-Day Event: June 8–10
 Number of Entries: 309
 Total Prize Pool: $702,975
 Number of Payouts: 32
 Winning Hand:

Event #19: $1,500 No Limit Hold'em

 3-Day Event: June 9–11
 Number of Entries: 2,302
 Total Prize Pool: $3,107,700
 Number of Payouts: 243
 Winning Hand:

Event #20: $5,000 Limit Hold'em

 3-Day Event: June 9–11
 Number of Entries: 166
 Total Prize Pool: $780,200
 Number of Payouts: 18
 Winning Hand:

Event #21: $1,000 No Limit Hold'em

 3-Day Event: June 10–12
 Number of Entries: 2,799
 Total Prize Pool: $2,519,100
 Number of Payouts: 297
 Winning Hand:

Event #22: $2,500 2-7 Triple Draw Lowball (Limit)

 3-Day Event: June 10–12
 Number of Entries: 228
 Total Prize Pool: $518,700
 Number of Payouts: 24
 Winning Hand:

Event #23: $3,000 No Limit Hold'em Six Handed

 3-Day Event: June 11–13
 Number of Entries: 924
 Total Prize Pool: $2,522,520
 Number of Payouts: 108
 Winning Hand:

Event #24: $5,000 Omaha Hi-Low Split-8 or Better

 4-Day Event: June 11–14
 Number of Entries: 256
 Total Prize Pool: $1,203,200
 Number of Payouts: 27
 Winning Hand:

Event #25: $1,500 Limit Hold'em Shootout

 3-Day Event: June 12–14
 Number of Entries: 366
 Total Prize Pool: $494,100
 Number of Payouts: 50
 Winning Hand:

Event #26: $3,000 Pot Limit Omaha

 3-Day Event: June 12–14
 Number of Entries: 589
 Total Prize Pool: $1,607,970
 Number of Payouts: 63
 Winning Hand:

Event #27: $1,500 H.O.R.S.E.

 4-Day Event: June 13–16
 Number of Entries: 889
 Total Prize Pool: $1,200,150
 Number of Payouts: 96
 Winning Hand:  (Stud Hi/Lo)

Event #28: $2,500 No Limit Hold'em Four Handed

 3-Day Event: June 14–16
 Number of Entries: 750
 Total Prize Pool: $1,706,250
 Number of Payouts: 80
 Winning Hand:

Event #29: $1,000 Seniors No Limit Hold'em Championship

 4-Day Event: June 15–18
 Number of Entries: 4,128
 Total Prize Pool: $3,715,200
 Number of Payouts: 423
 Winning Hand:

Event #30: $1,500 2-7 Draw Lowball (No Limit)

 3-Day Event: June 15–17
 Number of Entries: 285
 Total Prize Pool: $384,750
 Number of Payouts: 35
 Winning Hand:

Event #31: $1,500 No Limit Hold'em

 3-Day Event: June 16–18
 Number of Entries: 2,811
 Total Prize Pool: $3,794,850
 Number of Payouts: 297
 Winning Hand:

Event #32: $10,000 H.O.R.S.E.

 3-Day Event: June 16–18
 Number of Entries: 178
 Total Prize Pool: $1,673,200
 Number of Payouts: 24
 Winning Hand:  (Stud)

Event #33: $1,000 No Limit Hold'em

 3-Day Event: June 17–19
 Number of Entries: 2,795
 Total Prize Pool: $2,515,500
 Number of Payouts: 297
 Winning Hand:

Event #34: $5,000 Pot Limit Omaha Six Handed

 3-Day Event: June 18–20
 Number of Entries: 419
 Total Prize Pool: $1,969,300
 Number of Payouts: 42
 Winning Hand:

Event #35: $2,500 Mixed Hold'em

 3-Day Event: June 18–20
 Number of Entries: 393
 Total Prize Pool: $894,075
 Number of Payouts: 45
 Winning Hand:

Event #36: $3,000 No Limit Hold'em Shootout

 3-Day Event: June 19–21
 Number of Entries: 587
 Total Prize Pool: $1,602,510
 Number of Payouts: 60
 Winning Hand:

Event #37: $2,500 Eight Game Mix

 4-Day Event: June 19–22
 Number of Entries: 477
 Total Prize Pool: $1,085,175
 Number of Payouts: 48
 Winning Hand:  (Razz)

Event #38: $1,500 No Limit Hold'em

 3-Day Event: June 20–22
 Number of Entries: 2,534
 Total Prize Pool: $3,420,900
 Number of Payouts: 270
 Winning Hand:

Event #39: $10,000 Pot Limit Omaha

 3-Day Event: June 21–23
 Number of Entries: 293
 Total Prize Pool: $2,754,200
 Number of Payouts: 36
 Winning Hand:

Event #40: $2,500 Limit Hold'em Six Handed

 3-Day Event: June 21–23
 Number of Entries: 302
 Total Prize Pool: $687,050
 Number of Payouts: 36
 Winning Hand:

Event #41: $3,000 No Limit Hold'em

 4-Day Event: June 22–25
 Number of Entries: 1,394
 Total Prize Pool: $3,805,620
 Number of Payouts: 144
 Winning Hand:

Event #42: $2,500 Omaha/Seven Card Stud Hi-Low 8 or Better

 3-Day Event: June 22–24
 Number of Entries: 393
 Total Prize Pool: $894,075
 Number of Payouts: 40
 Winning Hand:

Event #43: $1,500 No Limit Hold'em

 3-Day Event: June 23–25
 Number of Entries: 2,770
 Total Prize Pool: $3,739,500
 Number of Payouts: 297
 Winning Hand:

Event #44: $1,000 No Limit Hold'em

 3-Day Event: June 24–26
 Number of Entries: 2,949
 Total Prize Pool: $2,654,100
 Number of Payouts: 297
 Winning Hand:

Event #45: $50,000 The Poker Players Championship

 5-Day Event: June 24–28
 Number of Entries: 108
 Total Prize Pool: $5,184,000
 Number of Payouts: 16
 Winning Hand:  (Omaha-8)

Event #46: $2,500 No Limit Hold'em

 3-Day Event: June 25–27
 Number of Entries: 1,607
 Total Prize Pool: $3,655,925
 Number of Payouts: 171
 Winning Hand:

Event #47: $1,500 Pot Limit Omaha Hi-Low Split-8 or Better

 3-Day Event: June 26–28
 Number of Entries: 978
 Total Prize Pool: $1,320,300
 Number of Payouts: 117
 Winning Hand:

Event #48: $3,000 Limit Hold'em

 3-Day Event: June 26–28
 Number of Entries: 247
 Total Prize Pool: $674,310
 Number of Payouts: 27
 Winning Hand:

Event #49: $1,500 Ante Only No Limit Hold'em

 3-Day Event: June 27–29
 Number of Entries: 939
 Total Prize Pool: $1,267,650
 Number of Payouts: 117
 Winning Hand:

Event #50: $5,000 No Limit Hold'em

 4-Day Event: June 28-July 1
 Number of Entries: 1,001
 Total Prize Pool: $4,704,700
 Number of Payouts: 117
 Winning Hand:

Event #51: $1,000 Ladies No Limit Hold'em Championship

 3-Day Event: June 29-July 1
 Number of Entries: 936
 Total Prize Pool: $842,400
 Number of Payouts: 117
 Winning Hand:

Event #52: $2,500 10-Game Mix Six Handed

 3-Day Event: June 29-July 1
 Number of Entries: 421
 Total Prize Pool: $957,775
 Number of Payouts: 48
 Winning Hand:  (2-7 Triple Draw)

Event #53: $1,500 No Limit Hold'em

 4-Day Event: June 30-July 3
 Number of Entries: 3,166
 Total Prize Pool: $4,274,100
 Number of Payouts: 324
 Winning Hand:

Event #54: $1,000 No Limit Hold'em

 4-Day Event: July 1–4
 Number of Entries: 3,221
 Total Prize Pool: $2,898,900
 Number of Payouts: 324
 Winning Hand:

Event #55: $1,000,000 The Big One for One Drop

 3-Day Event: July 1–3
 Number of Entries: 48
 Total Prize Pool: $42,666,672
 Number of Payouts: 9
 Winning Hand:

Event #56: $1,500 No Limit Hold'em

 3-Day Event: July 2–4
 Number of Entries: 2,798
 Total Prize Pool: $3,777,300
 Number of Payouts: 297
 Winning Hand:

Event #57: $10,000 No Limit Hold'em Six Handed

 4-Day Event: July 3–6
 Number of Entries: 474
 Total Prize Pool: $4,455,600
 Number of Payouts: 48
 Winning Hand:

Event #58: $3,000 Pot Limit Omaha Hi-Low Split-8 or Better

 4-Day Event: July 3–6
 Number of Entries: 526
 Total Prize Pool: $1,435,980
 Number of Payouts: 54
 Winning Hand:

Event #59: $1,000 No Limit Hold'em

 4-Day Event: July 4–7
 Number of Entries: 4,620
 Total Prize Pool: $4,158,000
 Number of Payouts: 468
 Winning Hand:

Event #60: $10,000 2-7 Draw Lowball (No Limit)

 3-Day Event: July 5–7
 Number of Entries: 101
 Total Prize Pool: $949,400
 Number of Payouts: 14
 Winning Hand:

Event #61: $10,000 No Limit Hold'em Main Event

 10-Day Event: July 7–16
 Final Table: October 29–30
 Number of Entries: 6,598
 Total Prize Pool: $62,021,200
 Number of Payouts: 666
 Winning Hand:

Notes

World Series of Poker
World Series of Poker Results, 2012